Bride to Be is a 1975 Spanish film, directed by Rafael Moreno Alba and starring Sarah Miles and Stanley Baker. It was also known as Pepita Jiménez, title of the novel in which the film is based (Written and published by Juan Valera in 1874).

It was Baker's last feature film.

Plot
A rich land owner in Spain has a mistress. She falls for his son who is about to become a priest.

Cast
Sarah Miles as Pepita Jiménez
Stanley Baker as Pedro De Vargas
Peter Day as Luis De Vargas
Eduardo Bea as Curro
Vicente Soler as Vicar
Jose Maria Caffarell as Dean
Mario Vico as Macarena

References

External links

1975 films
Spanish drama films
1970s Spanish films